Kevin John Bazzana (born 1963) is a Canadian music historian and biographer, best known for his works on the Canadian pianist Glenn Gould. Bazzana is a graduate of the University of Victoria in British Columbia, Canada, and the University of California at Berkeley. He lives in Brentwood Bay, British Columbia.

Literary career
Kevin Bazzana has written two books about Gould, Glenn Gould: The Performer in the Work (1997) and Wondrous Strange: The Life and Art of Glenn Gould (2003). Wondrous Strange was nominated for the 2004 Edna Staebler Award for Creative Non-Fiction. Bazzana also wrote a book about Hungarian pianist Ervin Nyiregyházi, Lost Genius: The Story of a Forgotten Musical Maverick (2007). Lost Genius was a nominee for the 2008 Charles Taylor Prize.

Bazzana also wrote the liner notes for the 2007 Zenph Studios Re-Performance CD Bach: The Goldberg Variations on Sony BMG.

References

External links
 Author Spotlight: Kevin Bazzana at McClelland & Stewart
 

1963 births
Canadian music historians
Canadian male non-fiction writers
Canadian biographers
Male biographers
Living people
People from the Capital Regional District
20th-century Canadian non-fiction writers
20th-century Canadian male writers
21st-century Canadian non-fiction writers
20th-century biographers
21st-century biographers